Breaston is a large village and civil parish in the Erewash district, in the south-east of Derbyshire and lies approximately  east of the city of Derby and  west of the city of Nottingham. The population of the civil parish as taken at the 2011 Census was 4,455. The settlement name Breaston means 'Braegd's farm/settlement': (Old English) for a personal name and 'tūn' (Old English) for either an enclosure, farmstead, village, etc.

History

Mentioned in the Domesday Book Survey of 1086, Breaston was a settlement in the Hundred of Morleystone wapentake and the county of Derbyshire. It had an estimated population of 15.8 households in 1086. At the time it was mentioned as belonging to Henry de Ferrers (Henry was given a large number of manors in Derbyshire including land in Swarkestone, Markeaton, Sinfin and Cowley) and being worth four shillings. The village Church of St Michael is a Grade I listed building. Structural parts of the interior, for example "double-chamfered pointed arches on octagonal piers" appear to be of 11th century in origin. The village of Breaston is clearly visible on the 1648 map of Derbyshire, produced (in Latin) by the Dutch cartographer Joan Blaeu, written as "Braston".

Breaston today is mainly residential. There is the church (St Michael), a primary school, a Methodist chapel, three pubs (three of them still named as they were in 1846 - The Bulls Head, Chequers Inn and The Navigation Inn); a medical centre and a comprehensive range of shops, including a Co-op, located in the centre of the village around the church and the village green. The green (known as Duffield Close) is said to be one of the largest in the country   and an annual May Day Fete is held there.

Railway Station
The first Long Eaton railway station was on Sawley Lane, Breaston.  First used in 1839, when the line opened, it was the third station on the line west from Nottingham.  It was originally called Breaston, but the name was changed to Sawley railway station to avoid confusion with nearby Beeston.

Sport
Although only a relatively small village, Breaston is home to its fair share of sports teams.

Football
Breaston Park FC, founded in 2007, is a child and youth football structure who have various teams at a range of age levels. The Club was nominated for, and won, Erewash Sports Club of the Year 2009, and YEL Small Club of the Year in 2011.

Athletica FC play on Breaston Recreation Ground (in the winter months).

Cricket
Breaston Cricket Club, formed in 1836 play on the Soldiers and Sailors Ground, Risley Lane.

Transport

HS2
In early October 2014, reports emerged that Breaston may be the preferred location for the East Midlands Hub High Speed 2 Phase Two railway station, reverting earlier plans to base the station at Toton, Nottinghamshire.  These plans were ruled out by July 2015.

Notable residents
 Blessed Edward James, (c.1557-1588) Catholic martyr.
 Rt. Hon. Geoff Hoon MP, (1953- ) who was Secretary of State for Defense from 1999 to 2005, during the 2nd Iraq war.
 Molly Windsor (1997- ) who is an English actress.

See also
 Listed buildings in Breaston
 Western Mere Secondary School

References

External links
 Breaston Parish Council
 Breaston Village Website
 Breaston Pre-school Playgroup
 Page at Erewash Council
 Shops in Breaston
 Breaston Cricket Club Website
 Breaston Park Football Club
 Breaston Park Football Club - pitchero site

Villages in Derbyshire
Civil parishes in Derbyshire
Borough of Erewash